The Nationalist Front of Mexico, formerly known as the Organization for the National Will and the Mexicanist Nationalist Front, is a far-right Mexican nationalist group, known for its use of Nazi paraphernalia. Since its formation in 2006, the Nationalist Front of Mexico claims it was formed by people from different political tendencies, social positions and cultural backgrounds who fight legally and peacefully for the national renewal of their country and the unity of the Mexican nation.

Beliefs

The Nationalist Front proposes a distributist economy, socialization and the Third-Positionist ideology. The group also wants Mexico to withdraw from the World Trade Organization (WTO), the North American Free Trade Agreement (NAFTA), and the International Monetary Fund (IMF).

The organization opposes foreign culture and influences, and it despises the Treaty of Guadalupe Hidalgo of 1848, in which Mexico lost half its territory that now forms part of the southwestern United States.

The platform posted on their website states:

"We reject the occupation of our nation in its northern territories, an important cause of poverty and emigration. We demand that our claim to all the territories occupied by force by the United States be recognized in our Constitution, and we will bravely defend, according to the principle of self-determination to all peoples, the right of the Mexican people to live in the whole of our territory within its historical borders, as they existed and were recognized at the moment of our independence."

Similarly, it promotes the reincorporation of Central America to Mexico.

In recent years, the group has gained notoriety for honoring Maximilian I of Mexico and conservatives of the 19th century such as Miguel Miramón and Tomás Mejía Camacho. Members have also held protests in various cities to demand the immediate expulsion of Haitian immigrants who entered Mexico in the fall of 2016 on their way to the United States. Nationalist Front leader Juan C. Lopez Lee called on the Mexican government to stop issuing transit documents to Haitian migrants.

Political activism
On its official website, the organization declares its opposition to all forms of violence and states that its primary goal is to win Mexicans' approval and adherence to their nationalist points of view. However, representatives of the front have made open calls for Mexicans to join in their struggle against foreigners and sexual minorities. Human right advocates in Mexico have raised their concerns about the group's rhetoric and increasing popularity among the youth.

The FNM has yet not been able to register with the Mexican authorities for elections, and thus cannot nominate candidates for Presidential or legislative elections.

See also

 National Synarchist Union
 Gold shirts

References

External links
Official site 

2006 establishments in Mexico
Far-right politics in Mexico
Fascism in Mexico
Mexican nationalism
Monarchism in Mexico
Organizations established in 2006
Political organizations based in Mexico
Falangists
Monarchist organizations
Neo-Nazi organizations
Anti-communist organizations
Neo-Nazism in North America